Paul Norman Telfer (born 21 October 1971) is a Scottish football coach and former professional footballer.

Telfer made over 300 league appearances in the Premier League for Coventry City and Southampton between 1995 and 2005. He previously played over 150 times for Luton Town. In 2005, he signed for Scottish Premier League side Celtic where he made 57 appearances in two seasons in his native country. He has since gone on to feature for AFC Bournemouth and Leeds United before finishing his career with non-league side Slough Town in 2009. He was capped once by Scotland in 2004, having previously been capped at U21 and B team level.

In 2011, he joined the coaching staff at Sutton United and also agreed to make a return to the playing side of the game. He has also had a spell with North American Soccer League team Indy Eleven as assistant coach.

Club career

Luton Town
Telfer was born in Edinburgh, but began his career at Luton Town as a right-sided midfielder. He made over 150 competitive first team appearances for Luton including 144 league games.

In November 1992, Telfer and then Luton teammate Darren Salton were involved in a head on car crash in Bedfordshire. Telfer, the driver of the car, suffered only minor injuries and went on to make a full recovery. Salton spent seven days on a life support machine and a further two and half weeks in a coma. Salton was forced to quit football following the accident. A 51-year-old female passenger in the other car was killed.

Coventry City
In the summer of 1995, he was signed by manager Ron Atkinson for Coventry City, where he began his long association with Gordon Strachan, who at the time was player-coach at the club, and later became manager. While at Coventry, Telfer won his only senior Scotland cap. Selected by Craig Brown he played in Scotland's 2–0 friendly defeat against France on 29 March 2000 at Hampden Park.

Southampton
In October 2001, shortly after Coventry's relegation from the Premiership, Telfer joined Southampton, who had appointed Strachan as manager just over a month earlier. At Southampton, Telfer was converted from midfielder to right-back, and was a member of the side that reached the 2003 FA Cup Final. He scored once during his spell at Southampton, in a 3–1 win over Newcastle in May 2002.

Celtic
In 2005, Strachan became manager at Celtic, and again made Telfer one of his first signings. Telfer played just under two years at Parkhead, where he won two Scottish League championships and scored once in the league against Aberdeen. However, his family had difficulty settling in Glasgow, and on 3 December 2006, Telfer announced he would not renew his contract with Celtic because he wished to spend more time with his family in Winchester. On 2 April 2007, Telfer brought forward his retirement and officially left Celtic to be with his family in England.

AFC Bournemouth
On 13 July 2007, Telfer came out of retirement, signing a one-year contract with League One side AFC Bournemouth. On 12 December 2007, Telfer cancelled his contract with Bournemouth to help their financial problems. A few days earlier, he had been ruled out for the season with a foot injury that required surgery and retired again.

Leeds United
On 8 August 2008, Telfer came out of retirement for a second time and joined Leeds United on a non-contract basis after initially training with Leeds to keep fitness. He signed a one-year deal with the club at the end of August. Impressing his former teammate Gary McAlliser who was managing Leeds at the time. Telfer was expected to act as cover for right back Frazer Richardson.

But after some poor performances by Leeds' centre backs, Telfer found himself playing in an unfamiliar centre back role after impressing for Leeds in the position in a League Cup game against Crystal Palace. Telfer at first put in some assured performances, but as the season went on Leeds became very vulnerable, with Telfer's lack of pace being exposed. Most notably in injury time against Huddersfield Town after Leeds conceded a goal, where Telfer's lack of pace was badly exposed. Gary McAllister was sacked in December, and new manager Simon Grayson left Telfer out of all of his first team squads during his first month at the club. On 2 February 2009, his contract was cancelled by mutual consent with Telfer saying he didn't want Leeds to spend money paying his wages whilst he wasn't going to play.

Slough Town and Sutton United 
In April 2009, Telfer signed for non-league Slough Town, but failed to appear in the 2009–10 season. In the 2011 close-season, it was announced that Telfer would be joining Sutton United in a player/coach capacity.

International career
He was capped once by Scotland in 2004, having previously been capped at U21 and B team level.

Coaching career
In May 2014, Telfer joined the North American Soccer League team Indy Eleven as an assistant coach working under head coach Juergen Sommer who was a teammate during his time at Luton Town F.C. On 2 June 2015, Telfer was released from the coaching staff of Indy Eleven along with Sommer

Personal life 
Telfer is a nephew of Eamonn Bannon, who also played for Scotland.

Career statistics

Honours
Southampton
 FA Cup runner-up: 2003

Celtic
 Scottish Premier League: 2006, 2007
 Scottish League Cup: 2006

References

External links 
 
 Feature in The Scotsman
 Scotland U21 stats at Fitbastats
 Scotland B stats at Fitbastats

1971 births
Living people
Footballers from Edinburgh
AFC Bournemouth players
Celtic F.C. players
Coventry City F.C. players
Leeds United F.C. players
Luton Town F.C. players
Scottish footballers
Southampton F.C. players
Scotland international footballers
Scotland B international footballers
Scotland under-21 international footballers
Premier League players
Scottish Premier League players
English Football League players
Slough Town F.C. players
Sutton United F.C. players
Association football fullbacks
FA Cup Final players